Bocharovka is a rural locality (a selo) in Starooskolsky District, Belgorod Oblast, Russia. The population was 56 as of 2010. There are 3 streets.

Geography 
Bocharovka is located 17 km northeast of Stary Oskol (the district's administrative centre) by road. Chumaki is the nearest rural locality.

References 

Rural localities in Starooskolsky District